Nauvoo Historic District is a National Historic Landmark District containing the city of Nauvoo, Illinois. The historic district is nearly coterminous with the City of Nauvoo as it was incorporated in 1840, but it also includes the Pioneer Saints Cemetery, the oldest Mormon cemetery in the area, which is outside the town boundary.

Contributing structures include:

 Brigham Young Home
 Concert Hall (no longer in existence)
 Heber C. Kimball House
 Jonathan Browning Houses and Workshops
 Joseph Smith Homestead
 Joseph Smith Mansion House
 Cultural Hall (Masonic Lodge)
 Nauvoo House
 Nauvoo Illinois Temple
 Red Brick Store
 The Seventies Hall
 Times and Seasons Building
 Wilford Woodruff House
 Yearsley House

There are many non-contributing, modern structures in the district.

The district was declared a National Historic Landmark in 1961.  It is significant as the headquarters of  The Church of Jesus Christ of Latter-day Saints (LDS Church) from 1839 and 1846, and as an important early example of community planning by the LDS church.  The city's basic plan is still discernible despite the many modern intrusions, and there are a wealth of historical archaeological sites related to the early LDS settlement period, including the site of the main temple, which occupied a prominent location in the city; it was burned in 1848 and its remains were leveled by a tornado in 1865.  Due to the large influx of Mormons, Nauvoo became Illinois's largest city for a brief period in the 1840s.  Despite this, it lacked a distinct commercial center, consisting mainly of residences laid out on broad streets on a rectangular grid.

The Mormons were forced out of Nauvoo in 1848. The formerly Mormon houses were then used as homes by others for the following century.  In the mid-1950s, Mormon preservationists began to purchase and restore Mormon sites to create a cultural center related to the history of Mormonism.

See also

 History of Nauvoo, Illinois
 List of National Historic Landmarks in Illinois

References

External links
 Historic Nauvoo - information on Nauvoo's historic sites, from the Illinois Nauvoo Mission of the Church of Jesus Christ of Latter-day Saints

1839 establishments in Illinois
Latter Day Saint movement in Illinois
National Historic Landmarks in Illinois
Historic District
Significant places in Mormonism
Tourist attractions in Hancock County, Illinois
National Register of Historic Places in Hancock County, Illinois
Historic districts on the National Register of Historic Places in Illinois
Mormon museums in the United States